Pat Boran (born 1963) is an Irish poet.

Biography 
Born in Portlaoise, Boran has lived in Dublin for a number of years. He is the publisher of the Dedalus Press which specialises in contemporary poetry from Ireland, and international poetry in English-language translation, and was until 2007 Programme Director of the annual Dublin Writers Festival. Currently he is the presenter of "The Poetry Programme", a weekly half-hour poetry programme on RTÉ Radio 1, where he has interviewed poets such as Tess Gallagher, Tony Curtis, John Haynes, Gerry Murphy and Jane Hirshfield.  

His poetry publications include The Unwound Clock (1990), History and Promise (1991), Familiar Things (1993), The Shape of Water (1996), As the Hand, the Glove (2001) and The Next Life (2012). His New and Selected Poems (2005), with an introduction by the Dennis O'Driscoll, was first published by Salt Publishing UK and was reissued in 2007 by Dedalus Press. Waveforms: Bull Island Haiku, a book-length haiku sequence or rensaku that explores the interplay of flora, fauna and human activity on Dublin Bay's Bull Island was published in 2015 by Orange Crate Books. The book also features the author's own photographs. A Man Is Only As Good: A Pocket Selected Poems was published in 2017, also by Orange Crate Books. In 2019, he published the poetry collection Then Again (Dedalus Press, 2019). Volumes of his selected poems have appeared in Italian, Hungarian, Portuguese and Macedonian. His writers' handbook, The Portable Creative Writing Workshop (2005), is now in its fourth edition while his A Short History of Dublin (2000) is published by Mercier Press. In 2007, Boran was elected to the membership of Aosdána, the Irish affiliation of artists and writers. In 2019, Boran co-edited a volume of poetry with Chiamaka Enyi-Amadi, Writing Home: The New Irish Poets.

Awards and honours
 1989 - Patrick Kavanagh Poetry Award 
 2007 - Elected member of Aosdána
 2008 - Lawrence O'Shaughnessy Award for Irish Poetry from the University of St. Thomas (Minnesota).

Works

Poetry books
2019: Then Again (Dedalus Press)
2018: o sussurro da corda Selected poems in Portuguese translation by Francisco José Craveiro de Carvalho (ediçóes Eufeme)
2017: A Man Is Only As Good: A Pocket Selected Poems (Orange Crate Books, distributed by Dedalus Press)
2015: Waveforms: Bull Island Haiku (Orange Crate Books, via Dedalus press)
2012: The Next Life (Dedalus Press)
 2007: New and Selected Poems (Dedalus Press)
 2001: As the Hand, the Glove (Dedalus Press)
 1996: The Shape of Water (Dedalus Press)
 1993: Familiar Things (Dedalus Press)
 1990: History and Promise (IUP)
 1990: The Unwound Clock (Dedalus Press)

Anthologies
 2014: If Ever You Go: A Map of Dublin in Poetry and Song (Dedalus Press), edited with Gerard Smyth. Dublin: One City, One Book designated title, 2014.
 2012: Airborne: Poetry from Ireland (Dedalus Press). Anthology of contemporary Irish poetry exclusive to iBooks platform.
 2011: Shine On: Irish Writers for Shine (Dedalus Press), Irish poets and fiction writers in supports of those affected by mental ill health
 2011: The Bee-Loud Glade: A Living Anthology of Irish Poetry (Dedalus). Anthology of some twenty Irish poets together with accompanying audio CD of selected poems set to music and performed by Crazy Dog Audio Theatre.
 2008: Flowing Still: Irish Poets on Irish Poetry (Dedalus). Essays by some of the best-known names in contemporary Irish writing.
 2006: Wingspan: A Dedalus Sampler (Dedalus). An introduction to some of the Irish and international poets on the Dedalus list.

Fiction
 1998: All the Way from China (Poolbeg)
 1991: Strange Bedfellows (Salmon)

Non-fiction
 2000: A Short History of Dublin (Mercier)
 2005: The Portable Creative Writing Workshop (New Island)
 2009: The Invisible Prison: Scenes from an Irish Childhood (Dedalus Press)

References

External links
Pat Boran's Web site
The Invisible Prison
Dedalus Press

1963 births
Living people
Irish poets
People from Portlaoise
People from County Laois
Aosdána members